The 2004–05 Belarusian Extraliga season was the 13th season of the Belarusian Extraliga, the top level of ice hockey in Belarus. 12 teams participated in the league, and HK Yunost Minsk won the championship.

Regular season

Playoffs
Quarterfinals
 HK Yunost Minsk - Khimik-SKA Novopolotsk 3-0 on series
 HK Khimvolokno Mogilev - HK Riga 2000 3-0 on series
 HK Keramin Minsk - HK Liepājas Metalurgs 3-1 on series
 HK Sokil Kiev - HK Gomel 3-2 on series
Semifinals
 HK Yunost Minsk - HK Khimvolokno Mogilev 4-0 on series
 HK Keramin Minsk - HK Sokil Kiev 4-2 on series
Final
 HK Yunost Minsk - HK Keramin Minsk 4-1 on series
3rd place
 HK Khimvolokno Mogilev - HK Sokil Kiev 2-0 on series

External links 
 Season on hockeyarchives.info

Belarusian Extraleague
Belarusian Extraleague seasons
Extra